Emericella filifera  is a fungus. Its ascospores form long appendages that emerge radially from narrow stellate crests. It was isolated from raisins in Argentina.

See also
Emericella discophora
Emericella olivicola
Emericella stella-maris

References

Trichocomaceae
Fungi described in 2008